Romano Ceciel Postema (born 7 February 2002) is a Dutch professional footballer who plays as a forward for Roda on loan from Groningen.

Club career
On 6 March 2019, Postema signed his first professional contract with FC Groningen. He made his professional debut with Groningen in a 2–1 Eredivisie loss to Heracles Almelo 31 August 2019.

On 6 October 2020, he was sent on a season-long loan to FC Den Bosch. On 31 August 2022, Postema was loaned to Roda for the season.

International career
Postema was selected for the Netherlands U17 national team's squad for the 2019 FIFA U-17 World Cup, but made only one added-time substitute appearance in the group stage as Netherlands finished fourth.

References

External links
 
 

2002 births
Living people
Footballers from Groningen (city)
Dutch footballers
Netherlands youth international footballers
Association football forwards
FC Groningen players
FC Den Bosch players
Roda JC Kerkrade players
Eredivisie players
Eerste Divisie players